Hernán Torres Oliveros (born 18 February 1961) is a Colombian football manager and retired goalkeeper who is the current manager of Deportes Tolima.

Honours
América de Cali
 Primera B: 2016

Millonarios
 Primera A: 2012 Finalización

References

Living people
Colombian football managers
Expatriate football managers in Costa Rica
1961 births
Deportes Tolima footballers
Águilas Doradas Rionegro players
Millonarios F.C. players
Millonarios F.C. managers
Independiente Medellín managers
Independiente Medellín footballers
L.D. Alajuelense managers
América de Cali managers
FBC Melgar managers
Deportes Tolima managers
Deportes Quindío footballers
Deportivo Pereira footballers
Atlético Nacional footballers
Lanceros Boyacá footballers
Once Caldas footballers
Colombian footballers
Association football goalkeepers
People from Ibagué
Águilas Doradas Rionegro managers